The Ashoka Chakra is a depiction of the Dharmachakra. It is called so because it appears on a number of edicts of Ashoka, most prominent among which is the Lion Capital of Ashoka. The most visible use of the Ashoka Chakra today is at the centre of the Flag of India (adopted on 22 July 1947), where it is rendered in a navy blue colour on a white background, replacing the symbol of charkha (spinning wheel) of the pre-independence versions of the flag.  It is also shown in the Ashoka Chakra medal which is the highest award for gallantry in peace time.

Symbolic history 
When Gautama Buddha achieved enlightenment at Bodh Gaya, he came to Sarnath. There, he found his five disciples Assaji, Mahānāman, Kondañña, Bhaddiya and Vappa, who had earlier abandoned him. He introduced his first teachings to them, thereby establishing the Dharmachakra;. This is the motif taken up by Ashoka and portrayed on top of his pillars.

The 24 spokes represent the twelve causal links taught by the Buddha and paṭiccasamuppāda (Dependent Origination, Conditional Arising) in forward and then reverse order. The first 12 spokes represent 12 stages of suffering. Next 12 spokes represent no cause no effect. So, due to awareness of mind, formation of mental conditioning stops. This process stops the process of birth and death i.e. nibbāna. It also depicts the “wheel of time” . The twelve causal links, paired with their corresponding symbols, are:
 Avidyā ignorance
 Asanskāra conditioning of mind unknowingly
 Avijñāna  not being conscious
 Nāmarūpa name and form (constituent elements of mental and physical existence)
 Ṣalāyatana six senses (eye, ear, nose, tongue, body, and mind)
 Sparśa contact
 Vedanā sensation
 Taṇhā thirst
 Upādāna grasping
 Bhava coming to be
 Jāti birth
 Jarāmaraṇa old age and death – corpse being carried.
These 12 in forward and reverse represent a total 24 spokes representing the dhamma.
The Ashoka Chakra is depicting the 24 principles that should be present in a human.

Inclusion in the national flag of India 
Ashoka Chakra was included in the middle of the national flag of India. The chakra intends to show that there is life in movement and death in stagnation. Dr B. R. Ambedkar was instrumental in reviving the legacy of Ashoka, and using the Ashokan Wheel on the flag was one of the ways where he tried to memorialize the Buddhist king.

Construction Sheet

See also
 Buddhist symbolism
 Chakra (disambiguation)
 Dharmachakra
 Vergina Sun

Notes 

Indian culture
National symbols of India
Memorials to Ashoka